Bouman may refer to:

 Bouman (surname)
 Bouman, Togo, Togolese village

See also
Bouwman